Alice Oluwafemi Ayo, a Nigerian paralympian who broke the world record for World Para Powerlifting Championships in Mexico and in Dubai.

Career
On 2 December 2017, she emerged the winner during the Championship competition in Mexico after lifting 140 kg in her first three attempt and on the fourth attempt, she broke the world record of 144 kg her compatriot set in 2014 with a 145 kg lift.

In January 2018, at the 9th Fazza World Para Powerlifting World Cup in Dubai, she broke her own record by a one kilogram and she made an attempt to lift 149 kg and failed.

References 

Living people
Year of birth missing (living people)
Place of birth missing (living people)
Paralympic powerlifters of Nigeria
Nigerian powerlifters
Nigerian female weightlifters
Yoruba sportswomen
21st-century Nigerian women